Still Caught Up is the fifth album by R&B musician Millie Jackson, issued by Spring Records in 1975. It includes the single, "Loving Arms" / "Leftovers."  A sequel to Jackson's previous album, Caught Up, which told the story of a woman having an affair with a married man, Still Caught Up reprises its themes of adultery and recrimination. Where Side A of Caught Up featured Jackson singing from the mistress' point of view and Side B from the jilted wife's point of view, Still Caught Up begins with the wife on Side A and concludes with the mistress on Side B.

Track listing 
 "Loving Arms" (Tom Jans) – 3:43
 "Making the Best of a Bad Situation" (Richard Kerr, Gary Osborne) – 3:00
 "The Memory of a Wife" (Millie Jackson, King Sterling) - 5:12
 "Tell Her It's Over" (Millie Jackson, King Sterling) – 4:06
 "Do What Makes You Satisfied" (Millie Jackson, King Sterling) – 3:38
 "You Can't Stand the Thought of Another Me" (Phillip Mitchell) – 2:51
 "Leftovers" (Phillip Mitchell) – 4:31
 "I Still Love You (You Still Love Me)" (Mac Davis, Mark James) – 4:39

Charts

Personnel
Millie Jackson - vocals

Musicians
 Barry Beckett - Keyboards
 Pete Carr - Guitar
 Charles Chalmers - Vocals
 Sandra Chalmers - Vocals
 Janie Fricke - Vocals
 David Hood - Bass
 Roger Hawkins - Drums
 Jimmy Johnson - Guitar
 Sandy Rhodes - Vocals
 Donna Rhodes - Vocals
 Tom Roady - Percussion

Others
 Mac Emmerman - Engineer
 Mike Lewis - Arranger, Conductor
 Jerry Masters - Engineer
 Steve Melton - Engineer
 Brad Shapiro - Conductor, Producer, Rhythm Arrangements
 Adam Skeaping	 - Post Production
 The Swampers	- Conductor, Rhythm Arrangements
 Ernie Winfrey	- Engineer
 Nima Yakubu - Photography

References

1975 albums
Millie Jackson albums
Albums produced by Brad Shapiro
Spring Records albums
Albums recorded at Muscle Shoals Sound Studio